Merton Daniel Simpson (September 20, 1928 – March 9, 2013) was an American abstract expressionist painter and African and tribal art collector and dealer.

Early life

Merton Simpson was born in Charleston, South Carolina. Between the ages of six and 11 he spent much of his time in and out of hospitals receiving treatment for diphtheria and rheumatic fever. During this time he started to doodle and sketch to pass the time. His interest in art grew and he began drawing and sketching in earnest. At the age of 13 Simpson was discovered by local artist William Halsey who took Simpson under his wing. For the next four years, Halsey taught Simpson the basics of painting and introduced him to the concept of abstract art. Jean Robertson Fleming, another local artist, was also instrumental in discovering Simpson’s talent and helping him hone his skills.

In the midst of a still segregated South, Simpson was not allowed to take art classes at the city run Gibbes Gallery where artist William Melton Halsey worked.  Simpson frequently went in to privately work with his mentor Halsey. Simpson attended Burke High School in Charleston. After graduating in 1949 Halsey, his wife Corrie McCallum and former director of the Charleston Museum Laura Bragg sponsored Merton Simpson’s first solo art show. Two receptions for the art show were held; "one for whites and one for whites who didn't mind coming to a reception with blacks."

Education

Simpson became the first African American to receive a prestigious five-year fellowship from the Charleston Scientific and Cultural Education fund and left South Carolina in 1949 for New York City after he finished high school. He attended New York University (NYU) for the first year and got accepted by Cooper Union. He took classes at NYU during the day and Cooper Union at night. Simpson also got a job at the frame shop of Herbert Benevy. Many well-known artists came to the frame shop and in time critiqued Simpson's work and developed a relationship with him. At NYU Simpson became acquainted with Hale Woodruff, William Baziotes and Robert Motherwell. The New York School was also having its impact during that time and Merton Simpson came in close contact with Franz Kline, Max Weber and Willem de Kooning at the frame shop. Out of all the colleges Simpson attended in New York, he credited the frame shop for giving him his real education.

Air Force

Simpson enlisted in the Air Force in 1951 and went to Griffiss Air Force Base near Utica, New York for basic training. He did a portrait of base commander General Howell and assigned him to Special Service. Simpson also played in the Air Force Band, but was told that there was a greater need for artists. His title was official Air Force artist and he spent his time in service painting a number of military commanders including Chief of Staff General Nathan Farragut Twining and General Dwight D. Eisenhower who paid Simpson $100 for painting his portrait. When asked if he wanted to take a commission Simpson said that he wanted to go home to visit his ailing mother where he thought he would be of more use. His wish was granted. Some of his paintings are still on display in the Pentagon.

Simpson as artist and gallerist

After four years in the service, Simpson went back to NYU to resume his work. In 1951 his work appeared in an exhibition at the Museum of Modern Art and in 1954 his work was displayed in the Younger American Painters  exhibition at the Guggenheim Museum. As his reputation grew his artwork made exhibitions at a number of galleries in New York City and even Washington, DC. By 1955 Simpson had a one-person exhibition at the Bertha Schaeffer Gallery. As Simpson became more established in New York he also became interested in the School of Paris and established a residence in the capitol. The new environment had a clear and direct impact on his painting style which had been greatly shaped by the brush painters of the New York School. Simpson divided his time between Paris and New York where he set up his own gallery in the 1950s.  The Merton D. Simpson Gallery of Modern and Tribal Arts is famous for its exceptional collection of Tribal arts, and for artworks by his contemporaries Romare Bearden, Beauford Delaney, Norman Lewis, Charles Alston, Hale Woodruff and John Biggers, among others.

The Spiral Group

Simpson was a member of the Spiral Group which was formed by fellow artists and colleagues Romare Bearden, Al Hollingsworth, and Hale Woodruff. The purpose of Spiral was to gather African-American artists to discuss political and social issues, the Civil Rights Movement. The group was formed in part as a response to A. Philip Randolph's call for a "new visual order" that would be created in part by artists' contribution to the Black Freedom struggle. Members of the group worked together in obtaining buses to travel to the March on Washington in 1963. The focus of the group shifted from a more explicitly political trend to one that was more aesthetic and artistic. Bearden introduced Spiral members to collage work and the black and white artwork the group created reflected the political turmoil of the time.

Confrontation series

The 1960s created yet another shift in Simpson's style. The social and political movements of the decade in general and the Harlem Riot of 1964 which Simpson witnessed firsthand had a particular impact on his painting. The artist responded by creating the so-called "Confrontation" series of painting series that featured schematized black and white faces inter-meshed in an intense encounter. The works were greatly inspired by Bearden's collage technique.

African and tribal art dealer

Simpson was drawn to African and tribal art after seeing some sculptures that Paul Robeson, Julius Carl Clark and Hale Woodruff had in their personal collections. Simpson purchased his first African carving in 1949. He learned much about African and tribal art by visiting the gallery of Julius Carlebach, a dealer in rare items.  It was primarily Hale Woodruff's influence that drove Simpson's interest in African art.  Simpson began collecting and dealing modern artists alongside the traditional indigenous works of art from Africa.  His early art collection consisted of modern artists whose artwork was influenced by traditional African art such as Pablo Picasso, Amedeo Modigliani, Alberto Giacometti and Paul Klee.  As his knowledge and experience in the field grew he eventually became known as one of the most prominent dealers of traditional African art in the world and the international art world at large.

Personal life

Merton Simpson married Beatrice Houston, his childhood sweetheart from South Carolina in 1954.  He opened his Madison Avenue art gallery to support his young family which also commemorates the birth of his first-born son, Merton Simpson Jr.  The couple had another son named, Kenneth Simpson in 1959.  Merton and Beatrice Simpson divorced in 2008.  He is survived by his two sons, Merton Jr. and Kenneth Simpson.

Musician

Along with art, Simpson has always possessed a deep passion for music which has at times complemented his artwork. He learned to play the saxophone, tenor sax, clarinet and flute as a youth in Charleston. Simpson played with the famed Jenkins Orphanage Band. Later in life he played with various jazz groups, ensembles and musicians including George Coleman and Harold Mabern.

The Merton Simpson Gallery

In 2000 the Merton Simpson Gallery moved to 38 West 28th Street in the Chelsea neighborhood of Manhattan. The gallery holds a large collection of African and tribal art, Modern art and Merton Simpson's works on paper and paintings.

Featured exhibitions on Merton D. Simpson's artwork:

1952    Metropolitan Museum of Art, New York
1954    Guggenheim Museum, New York
1956    Museum of Art, University of Michigan, Ann Arbor
1960    Krasner Gallery, New York
1978    Edward Merrin Gallery, New York
1979    Huntsville Museum, Alabama
1982    Langston Society, New York
1983    Charleston County Library, South Carolina 
1983    Allan Stone Gallery, New York
1984    Simon Center for the Arts, Charleston, South Carolina
1984    Bucknell University, Lewisburg, Pennsylvania
1990    Twinning Gallery, New York (solo)
1992    Noir d’Ivoire Gallery, Paris
1993    Tambaran Gallery, New York
1995    Gibbes Museum of Art, Charleston, SC
2009    Anita Shapolsky Gallery, New York
2009    Opalka Gallery, New York
2010    Greenville Museum of Art, Greenville, SC – Confrontation Series
2010    Hampton III Gallery, Greenville, SC – Retrospective curated by Sandy Rupp
2010    Wilmer Jennings Gallery, New York – curated by Juliette Pelletier and Corinne Jennings
2010    Webb's, New Zealand
2011    Merton D. Simpson Gallery, New York – Encore Tribute and exhibition curated by Juliette Pelletier and Karen Tuominen
2011  Brooklyn Museum of Art, New York – acquisition included in BMA permanent collection
2011   Studio Museum of Harlem, New York – Spiral Group
2019   Kalamazoo Institute of Arts, Kalamazoo, Michigan – Resilience: African American Artists As Agents of Change

References

1928 births
2013 deaths
Abstract expressionist artists
Artists from Charleston, South Carolina
20th-century American painters
American male painters
21st-century American painters
African-American art dealers
American art dealers
20th-century African-American painters
21st-century African-American artists
20th-century American male artists